The Feminist and the Fuzz is a 1971 American made-for-television comedy film by Screen Gems starring Barbara Eden (in her television film debut), David Hartman, Jo Anne Worley, Herb Edelman and Julie Newmar. It premiered as the ABC Movie of the Week on January 26, 1971. The film was directed by Jerry Paris.

Plot
Pediatrician Jane Bowers is a women's lib advocate who meets Officer Jerry Frazer when they both show up to view an apartment in San Francisco. They immediately butt heads as her militant demand for equal treatment conflicts with his traditional "ladies first" attitude. Due to the shortage of affordable housing and a misunderstanding with the landlord, they agree to pose as a married couple to share the apartment since their work schedules don't overlap, an arrangement she openly shares with Wyatt, her understanding, liberal lawyer fiancé and Mother's boy, but with not her father. Jerry keeps the secret from his girlfriend, Kitty, a Bunny at the Playboy Club.

Fellow doctor and ultra-militant women's libber Debby organizes a disruptive swimsuit protest at the club, to which the police respond, including Jerry. He sees a bikini-clad Jane participating at the protest and sends her home in a taxicab instead of arresting her, infuriating her. An upset Jane calls her father to talk, which makes him concerned enough to drive into town. Prostitute and aspiring porn actress Lilah asks Jerry to arrest her so she has someplace to sleep. Kindhearted Jerry lets her stay in the apartment overnight while he's at work, but finds a note from Jane that she will be leaving because of his "sexual bigotry." Jane's father arrives and is let in by the landlord. He runs into Lilah and assumes she's Jane's roommate. The truth comes out when Jerry rushes home after finding out Jane has left work early. Kitty arrives and recognizes Jane from the protest. Wyatt and Debby also arrive. Jerry professes his love for Jane, who runs out in confusion as Kitty angrily disavows Jerry and asks to join Debby's organization, WAM (Women Against Men). Wyatt's masochistic desire to be dominated by women is confirmed as he finds Debby's pushiness attractive. Jerry chases after Jane and catches her in the middle of the intersection, where they embrace and kiss while causing traffic to back up.

Cast
 Barbara Eden as Dr. Jane Bowers
 David Hartman as Officer Jerry Frazer
 Jo Anne Worley as Dr. Debby Inglefinger
 Herb Edelman as Wyatt Foley
 Julie Newmar as Lilah McGuinness
 John McGiver as Warren Sorensen
 Farrah Fawcett as Kitty Murdock
 Harry Morgan as Dr. Horace Bowers
 Roger Perry as Dr. Howard Lassiter 
 Arthur Batanides as Joe

References

External links

1971 television films
1971 films
1971 comedy films
American comedy television films
1970s English-language films
ABC Movie of the Week
Films set in San Francisco
Films directed by Jerry Paris
1970s American films